The 2003 Race of Champions took place on November 28–30 at Gran Canaria for the final time. It was also the last year for three-car teams in the Nations' Cup (including one motorcycle racer), with the focus on rally drivers fading after this year's event due to the later stadium-based venues using all-tarmac tracks.

The vehicles used were the Peugeot 206 WRC, the Mitsubishi Lancer Evolution VIII Group N, the Subaru Impreza WRX and the ROC Buggy.

The individual competition was won by Sébastien Loeb, whilst the Nations' Cup was won by the All-Star line-up of Fonsi Nieto, Gilles Panizzi and Cristiano da Matta.

Participants

 Nick Heidfeld was originally confirmed for Germany but had prior commitments, his brother Sven taking his place.
 Johnny Herbert was originally confirmed for Great Britain but had prior commitments, Smith taking his place.
 Marcus Grönholm was to represent Finland, but due to testing commitments could not arrive in time for the Nations Cup. Salonen took his place.
 Kenny Brack was to represent Sweden, but due to injury sustained in a CART accident Wirdheim took his place.

Junior Rally Masters

Group stage

Final

Nations' Cup

Group stage

Group A

Group B

Group C

 USA progress to the semi-finals by having the fastest total time of the losing teams.

Best Times

Knockout stage

Semifinals

Final

Race of Champions

Participation in the main Race of Champions was awarded primarily on the basis of having the best times in the Nations' Cup. There were several exceptions to this rule however - Marcus Grönholm, as the defending champion, was guaranteed a spot, whilst Cristiano da Matta, despite having the best time among racing drivers in the Nations' Cup, did not participate. François Duval secured his place by winning the Junior event, Dani Sordo won the Spanish Masters event, Timo Salonen was an invited 'seeded' driver and Martin Rowe was invited for having won the 2003 PWRC title. Thomas Biagi meanwhile earned his place by beating FIA GT teammate Matteo Bobbi and Volkswagen Cup UK winner Rob Carvell.

Group stage

Group A

Group B

Knockout stage

Quarterfinals

Semifinals

Final

References

External links
https://web.archive.org/web/20050203014113/http://www.carreradecampeones.org/

2003
2003 in motorsport
2003 in Spanish motorsport
International sports competitions hosted by Spain
2003,Race of Champions